The Courtship of Eddie's Father is a 1963 American Metro-Goldwyn-Mayer romantic comedy film directed by Vincente Minnelli, and stars Glenn Ford as a widowed father and Ronny Howard as his caring son. The film was based on a 1961 novel by Mark Toby, as was the ABC-TV series of the same name with Bill Bixby and Brandon Cruz, which ran from 1969 to 1972.

Plot
Young Eddie Corbett (Ronny Howard) tries his best to be a matchmaker for his widowed father, Tom (Glenn Ford), a radio station executive. At first, sexy Dollye Daly (Stella Stevens) seems promising, but she ends up falling in love with and marrying Norman Jones (Jerry Van Dyke), Tom's friend and colleague.

Tom becomes attracted to a sophisticated socialite, Rita Behrens (Dina Merrill). They begin considering marriage, but Eddie takes an immediate dislike to Rita and she does not know how to deal with him, nor does she particularly wish to learn, and Tom eventually chooses his son over her.

Through all this, the Corbetts are supported by their new housekeeper, Mrs. Livingston (Roberta Sherwood), and by their divorced next-door neighbor, Elizabeth Marten (Shirley Jones). It takes a crisis for Tom to realize what has been under his nose all along.

Cast
 Glenn Ford as Tom Corbett
 Ron Howard as Eddie Corbett
 Shirley Jones as Elizabeth Marten
 Dina Merrill as Rita Behrens
 Stella Stevens as Dollye Daly
 Jerry Van Dyke as Norman Jones
 Roberta Sherwood as Mrs. Livingston

Production
Film rights to the novel were bought by MGM prior to publication for $100,000 in 1961. The Chicago Tribune called the novel "deeply moving, and at the same time, very funny."

Producer Joe Pasternak assigned John Gay to write the script and hired Glenn Ford to star. Shirley Jones accepted her role in part because she did not have to sing.

Roberta Sherwood, a nightclub singer and TV entertainer, made her film debut.

Pasternak says he interviewed hundreds of children to play Eddie but as soon as he talked to Ronny Howard  "I knew he was right."

The bowling alley sequence was filmed at the now-defunct Paradise Bowl, located at 9116 South Sepulveda Boulevard in Los Angeles (two miles north of LAX).

See also
 List of American films of 1963

References

External links

 
 
 
 
 

1963 films
1963 romantic comedy films
American romantic comedy films
Films about radio people
Films about widowhood
Films adapted into television shows
Films based on American novels
Films directed by Vincente Minnelli
Films produced by Joe Pasternak
Films with screenplays by John Gay (screenwriter)
Metro-Goldwyn-Mayer films
1960s English-language films
1960s American films